ρ Indi, Latinised as Rho Indi, (Bright Star designation HR 8701) is a yellow-hued star in the constellation Indus. With an apparent visual magnitude of +6.05 it is, barely, a naked eye star, not visible in the northern hemisphere outside the tropics.  Based upon an annual parallax shift of 37.39 mas, it is located 87 light years from the Sun. The star is moving closer to the Sun with a radial velocity of −4 km/s.

Properties
However, Houk and Cowley (1975) classified it as G2.5 IV, suggesting it is instead a somewhat more evolved subgiant star. It has an estimated 1.32 times the mass of the Sun and 1.46 times the Sun's radius. The star is radiating about 2.24 times the Sun's luminosity from its photosphere at an effective temperature of 5,849 K. It is around 4.6 billion years old and is spinning with a leisurely projected rotational velocity of 3.1 km/s.

Planetary system
On September 17, 2002, this star was found to have a planetary companion, designated Rho Indi b. The discovery was made by measuring variations in the host star's radial velocity, thereby indicating the presence of a perturbing object. Based upon the data, the object is orbiting the host star with a period of about 3.7 years at an eccentricity of 0.32. The semimajor axis for this orbit is around 2.5 times the distance from the Earth to the Sun. Since the inclination of the orbit to the line-of-sight is unknown, only a lower bound on the planet's mass can be determined. It has at least 2.3 times Jupiter's mass.

See also
 , a star with a separate exoplanet discovery by the same team

References

Indi, Rho
216437
113137
8701
G-type subgiants
Indus (constellation)
Planetary systems with one confirmed planet
Durchmusterung objects